Helen Koppell (born 15 June 1955) is a British diver. She competed at the 1972 Summer Olympics and the 1976 Summer Olympics.

References

1955 births
Living people
British female divers
Olympic divers of Great Britain
Divers at the 1972 Summer Olympics
Divers at the 1976 Summer Olympics
Sportspeople from Leicester